Staroye Domozerovo is a rural locality (a village) in Yugskoye Rural Settlement, Cherepovetsky District, Vologda Oblast, Russia. The population was 3 as of 2002.

Geography 
Staroye Domozerovo is located 26 km southeast of Cherepovets (the district's administrative centre) by road. Novoye Domozerovo is the nearest rural locality.

References 

Rural localities in Cherepovetsky District